The Second Board of Ministers was the executive body opposite the State Council of Ceylon between 1936 and 1947. It was formed in March 1936 after the state council election and it ended in June 1947 with dissolution of the 2nd State Council. The Board of Ministers consisted of ten members, three ex-officio British officials (Chief Secretary, Financial Secretary and Legal Secretary) and the chairmen of the State Council's seven executive committees. The Chief Secretary was the chairman of the Board of Ministers whilst the Leader of the State Council was its vice-chairman.

Members

References
 

1936 establishments in Ceylon
1947 disestablishments in Ceylon
Cabinets established in 1936
Cabinets disestablished in 1947
Cabinet of Sri Lanka
Ministries of Edward VIII
Ministries of George VI
State Council of Ceylon